The Charleston Distance Run is a  road running event held annually in Charleston, West Virginia.  The race starts in front of the West Virginia State Capitol on the Kanawha Boulevard.  The course starts on the flats of the Boulevard before going across the South Side Bridge and up Corridor G, a hill named Capital Hill Punishment for its nearly  uphill length.  The course winds through Charleston's South Hills for  before crossing back over the South Side Bridge. The final  are flat; runners go past the West Virginia State Capitol, along the Kanawha River, before finishing at Laidley Field.

History 
The race was started in 1973 by Don Cohen, an eye doctor in Charleston. Cohen wanted to create a race that coincided with the annual Sternwheel Regatta, so he teamed up with city leaders and police to find a route.

The race ended up being  quite by accident, as Cohen's main focus was to orientate the race around some of Charleston's most famous landmarks, such as the State Capitol, the Kanawha riverbank, the East End, West Side, and South Hills. Though the Sternwheel Regatta retired in 2008, the Distance Run continues as an independent event. To this day, it is America's only 15-mile distance run.

Past overall winners

External links
Charleston Distance Run
tristateracer.com
"History of the Charleston Distance Run", Gary Smith

Long-distance running competitions
Charleston, West Virginia
Tourist attractions in Kanawha County, West Virginia
Road running competitions in the United States